Abba Lot was an Egyptian Orthodox Christian monk and saint who lived around the 4th and 5th centuries in a monastery near Arsinoe (Al-Fayoum), lower Egypt, by a marshy lake. Abba Lot "...directed many brethren on the path to salvation." He was one of the Desert Fathers.

Abba Lot died peacefully in the fifth century. His feast day is October 22 in the Orthodox Church.

Life
Abba Lot was a disciple of St. Joseph of Panephysis and a companion of St. Arsenius the Great and St. Agathon. He was an ascetic who lived near Arsinoe, close to Anthony the Great. His disciple was St. Peter the Pionite (died c. 400). Abba Lot opposed the Origenists.

Sayings 

 "Take heart: no sin is beyond God’s mercy. Repentance is always possible."
 Abba Lot once said to his spiritual father, Abba Joseph, "Father, I fast as much as I can, continue in prayer, keep silence and contemplate, and also, through abstinence, guard myself from impure thoughts. What else can I do?" Then Abba Joseph stood up, raised his hands to heaven, and his ten fingers shone like ten flaming candles. He said, "If you desire, you can become all aflame!"
 "Compunction is the absolute master. One cannot protect oneself where there is no compunction."

Stories 
An old man once came to Abba Lot and was ill. Abba Lot gave him a cell and took care of him, feeding him. He would direct visitors to this old man. When the old man began to teach the Origen heresy to the visitors, Abba Lot became distressed. He consulted St. Arsenius, who instructed Lot to ask to old man to stop teaching Origenism or to depart. The old man, disliking the desert, decided to leave.

Another time, a monk who had committed the sins of fornication and idol worship came to Abba Lot, tormented by his sins. He told the elder that he could not reveal his sins to the other elders and therefore could not confess. Abba Lot told him that he would bear half the weight of the sins for the man. Thus, the man confessed and was instructed in penance. Immediately, half the weight of the grievous sins lifted off the man's back. He stayed with Abba Lot for the rest of his life under his spiritual guidance.
 
The following story is from the Sayings of the Desert Fathers:

See also 
Abba Lot is commemorated in The Prologue of Ohrid by St. Nikolaj Velimirović on October 22.

 Desert Fathers
 Arsenius the Great
 Abba Or (monk)
 Abba Anoub
 Euprepius of Egypt
 Agathon (monk)
 Nikolaj Velimirović

References

4th-century births
5th-century deaths
Egyptian Christian monks
Saints from Roman Egypt
Eastern Catholic saints
Coptic Orthodox saints
Desert Fathers